Mathieu Pustjens (born 20 February 1948) is a Dutch racing cyclist. He rode in the 1972 Tour de France.

References

External links
 

1948 births
Living people
Dutch male cyclists
People from Echt-Susteren
Cyclists from Limburg (Netherlands)